Elizabeth Reid may refer to:

 Elizabeth Anne Reid (born 1942), Australian development practitioner and academic
 Elizabeth Jesser Reid (1789–1866), English social reformer, founder of Bedford College
 Elizabeth Julia Reid (1915–1974), Australian journalist and Grail movement leader
 Elizabeth Reid, Lady Hope (1842–1922), British evangelist
 Elizabeth Reid (volleyball) (born 1989), British volleyball player

See also
Elizabeth Reed (disambiguation)